Peter Antoine (born 25 September 1944, Essen, Germany) is a former football manager and player, who played for FC Bayern Munich. Antoine managed several Swedish clubs in the past.

References

1944 births
Living people
FC Bayern Munich footballers
German footballers
Association footballers not categorized by position
German footballers needing infoboxes
Footballers from Essen